David Knapp Stockton (born November 2, 1941) is an American retired professional golfer who has won tournaments on both the PGA Tour and the Champions Tour.

Stockton was born in San Bernardino, California. He attended the University of Southern California and turned professional in 1964. His first PGA Tour win came at the 1967 Colonial National Invitation. He was selected by former Colonial champions as one of two Champion's Choice invitations; he is the only Champion's Choice invitee to win the Colonial in the year of the invitation. His best year was 1974, when he won three times, but his two majors, both of which were PGA Championships, came in 1970 and 1976. In 1970 he played the final round with Arnold Palmer, shooting a seventy-three which included an eagle and a double-bogey on the seventh and the eighth holes, and making a bogey on the thirteenth despite putting a ball in the water. In the end, this effort was good enough for a two stroke victory over Palmer and Bob Murphy. Due to rain at the 1976 PGA Championship, which was held at the Congressional Country Club, the final round had to be delayed until Monday. Stockton sank a fifteen-foot par putt at the seventy-second hole to avoid a three-man playoff with Raymond Floyd and Don January.

Stockton joined the Senior PGA Tour (now the Champions Tour) in 1991 and enjoyed continued success, topping the Senior Tour money list in 1993 and 1994. His fourteen senior titles include three senior majors, the 1992 and 1994 Senior Players Championships and the 1996 U.S. Senior Open. He remained competitive in his sixties, finishing in the top 50 on the Champions Tour money list for a thirteenth consecutive season in 2004.

Stockton played for the U.S. team in the Ryder Cup in 1971 and 1977. He was the Americans' victorious non-playing captain in the 1991 Ryder Cup at Kiawah Island.

Stockton is married to former Orange Show beauty queen Catherine Hales. They have two children, Dave Jr. and Ron, who both play professional golf.

When he was an active PGA Tour player, Stockton had the reputation of being one of the best putters.  In 2009, Stockton was credited with aiding the world's second-ranked golfer, Phil Mickelson with his putting, which helped him win the 2009 Tour Championship. He wrote a guide to putting called "Unconscious Putting," which was released in 2011.

Professional wins (25)

PGA Tour wins (10)

PGA Tour playoff record (0–1)

Other wins (1)
1967 Haig & Haig Scotch Foursome (with Laurie Hammer)

Senior PGA Tour wins (14)

Senior PGA Tour playoff record (0–6)

Major championships

Wins (2)

Results timeline

CUT = missed the halfway cut
"T" indicates a tie for a place.

Summary

Most consecutive cuts made – 10 (1972 Open Championship – 1975 U.S. Open)
Longest streak of top-10s – 3 (1970 Masters – 1971 Masters)

Results in The Players Championship

CUT = missed the halfway cut
"T" indicates a tie for a place

Champions Tour major championships

Wins (3)

U.S. national team appearances
Professional
Ryder Cup: 1971 (winners), 1977 (winners), 1991 (winners, non-playing captain)
World Cup: 1970, 1976
Wendy's 3-Tour Challenge (representing Senior PGA Tour): 1994

See also
List of golfers with most PGA Tour wins
List of golfers with most PGA Tour Champions wins

References

External links

American male golfers
USC Trojans men's golfers
PGA Tour golfers
PGA Tour Champions golfers
Ryder Cup competitors for the United States
Winners of men's major golf championships
Winners of senior major golf championships
Golfers from California
Sportspeople from San Bernardino, California
People from Redlands, California
1941 births
Living people